Theodor Kolobow (1931 – 24 March 2018) was an American physician, scientist, physiologist, and inventor of medical devices, including the membrane oxygenator, common to most modern ventilators.

Early life and education 
Theodor Kolobow was born in the village of Kardla, Estonia. His father was a Russian Orthodox priest and lawyer. During World War II, he and his family spent time in a refugee camp in Augsburg, Germany, when forced to flee the invasion of the Russian Army. He learned to speak German, Russian, and English.

After World War II, at the age of 18, Kolobow and his family immigrated to the United States and he received a scholarship to attend Heidelberg College in Tiffin, Ohio. He was reported to have arrived in the United States with "$20 and his father's crucifix in his pocket." He graduated from Heidelberg College in 1954 with a degree in mathematics and physics. He graduated medical school at Case Western Reserve School of Medicine in 1958. As a first year medical student at Case Western, Kolobow worked in the laboratory of George H. A. Clowes on a project developing new methods to oxygenate blood during cardiopulmonary bypass.

Kolobow completed his medical training as a house officer in internal medicine and pulmonology at Cleveland Metropolitan General Hospital. He married his wife, Danielle, in 1963 and had 4 children and 9 grandchildren.

In 1962 he completed his medical training in Cleveland and joined the U.S. Public Health Service. He joined the NIH National Heart Institute as a staff associate and remained at NIH for the rest of his career.

Medical contributions 
Kolobow invented the silicone rubber spiral coil membrane lung, for which NIH was issued a patent in 1970.

Kolobow developed the artificial placenta with Warren Zapol and veterinarian Joseph Pierce in 1967.

References

1931 births
2018 deaths
American physicians
American scientists
American inventors
Estonian emigrants to the United States
People from Kärdla